Conway Barbour (1818–1876) was enslaved, worked as a ship steward, became a businessman, and lawyer. He served as a state legislator in Arkansas and was elected to the Arkansas House of Representatives in 1871. Professor Victoria L. Harrison wrote the 2018 book Fight Like a Tiger: Conway Barbour and the Challenges of the Black Middle Class in Nineteenth-Century America published by Southern Illinois University Press about him.

A Republican, he represented Lafayette County, Arkansas in the Arkansas House.

He died in Lake Village, Arkansas.

References

Members of the Arkansas House of Representatives
1818 births
1876 deaths
Place of birth missing